Manicomyia chirindana is a species of tephritid or fruit flies in the genus Manicomyia of the family Tephritidae.

Distribution
Mozambique, Zimbabwe.

References

Tephritinae
Insects described in 1935
Diptera of Africa